The Canadian Tulip Festival is a tulip festival, held annually in May in Ottawa, Ontario, Canada. The festival claims to be the world's largest tulip festival, displaying over one million tulips, with attendance of over 650,000 visitors annually. Large displays of tulips are planted throughout the city, and the largest display of tulips is found in Commissioners Park on the shores of Dow's Lake, and along the Rideau Canal with 300,000 tulips planted there alone.

History 
In 1945, the Dutch royal family sent 100,000 tulip bulbs to Ottawa in gratitude for Canadians having sheltered the future Queen Juliana and her family for the preceding three years during the Nazi occupation of the Netherlands in the Second World War. The most noteworthy event during their time in Canada was the birth in 1943 of Princess Margriet at the Ottawa Civic Hospital. The maternity ward was temporarily declared to be extraterritorial by the Canadian government, thereby allowing Princess Margriet's citizenship to be solely influenced by her mother's Dutch citizenship. In 1946, Juliana sent another 20,500 bulbs requesting that a display be created for the hospital, and promised to send 10,000 more bulbs each year.

The festival begins 

In the years following Queen Juliana's original donation, Ottawa became famous for its tulips and in 1953 the Ottawa Board of Trade and photographer Malak Karsh organized the first "Canadian Tulip Festival". Queen Juliana returned to celebrate the festival in 1967, and Princess Margriet returned in 2002 to celebrate the 50th anniversary of the festival.

For many years, the festival featured a series of outdoor music concerts in addition to the tulips.
The 1972 festival saw Liberace give an opening concert, and at the 1987 festival, Canadian singer Alanis Morissette made her first appearance at the age of 12. The Trews first became widely known after opening for Big Sugar at the 2003 festival. Montreal's General Rudie also gained valuable exposure early in their career with a performance at the 2000 festival.

1994–2006: World Friendship 
For a dozen years, the Canadian Tulip Festival celebrated countries all across the world, who have also adopted the Tulip as a Symbol of International Friendship.

2007: Reorganisation & Celebridée 
In 2007, the festival was reorganised under new leadership. Park admission charges were eliminated and a new feature called Celebridée: a Celebration of Ideas was introduced.  Another component of the 2007 festival was a fund-raising effort in support of War Child Canada. Beyond celebrating the tulip as a symbol of beauty and friendship, the Canadian Tulip Festival, through Celebridée, aims to present some of the most brilliant thinkers of our time speaking about ideas that matter. Celebridée continued to grow since its inception in 2007. 2008's speakers included Sir Salman Rushdie, Wired Magazine's Chris Anderson, Pulitzer Prize-winning author of Guns, Germs and Steel Jared Diamond, and pianist Angela Hewitt.

2019: Present: Re-Rooted 
In 2019, the festival once again changed leadership and management, into the hands of a younger board and management team. The goal of this most recent team is to Re-Root the festival in its history and horticulture. The festival has been returned to a single-site at Commissioners Park, with a Veterans Day Ceremony at Beechwood National Military Cemetery. In 2020, the planned celebrations for the 75th Anniversary of the Liberation of the Netherlands had to pivot to a Virtual Experience, due to the COVID-19 global pandemic. The Festival once again put forth a stunning display of horticulture including the use of aerial photography and 360-degree image capture of hundreds of breeds of tulips.

Official Sites
Commissioners Park – Dow's Lake 
Beechwood National Military Cemetery

Attraction Sites
National Gallery of Canada
Royal Canadian Mint
Library and Archives Canada
Canadian War Museum

Themes 

 1994: A Tribute to the Origin Country of the Tulip - Turkey
 1995: The Friendship That Flowered - 50th anniversary of the Liberation of the Netherlands
 1996: Floral Tribute to Nice
 1997: Floral Artistry of Japan
 1998: A Celebration of Canada's Provinces and Territories
 1999: Between Friends
 2000: Tulips 2000: A Capital Celebration!
 2001: Tulips Forever! A Salute to Britain
 2002: Tulipmania! 50th Anniversary
 2003: G'day Australia – Tulips Down Under
 2004: Canada's Tulip Experience
 2005: A Celebration of Peace and Friendship
 2006: Tulips 2006 – World Flower Rendezvous!
 2007: "CelebrIDÉE A Celebration of Ideas" inaugural year
 2008: Where Ideas Bloom
 2009: The Tulip Route
 2010: "Liberation" - The 65th anniversary of the liberation of Europe
 2011: "Kaleidoscope" - A celebration of Spring awakening through colour, culture and community
 2012: The Festival celebrates its 60th anniversary with “60 years of Tulip Friendship”.
 2013: “Cirque de Liberation”
 2014: “Floral Extravaganza”
 2015: “Tulip Liberation” celebrates the 70th Anniversary of the Liberation of Holland through colour, culture and community!
 2016: "Urban Tulip" - at Aberdeen Pavilion
 2017: “One Tulip – One Canada” The Festival's 65th edition takes place during Canada's 150th
 2018: "A World of Tulips"
 2019: Canadian Tulip Festival; ReRooted
 2020: Canadian Tulip Festival; Liberation75 (Held Online during CoVid19)
 2021: Canadian Tulip Festival; Liberation 75+1 and Rembrandt & Dutch Masters

Trivia
Because of the ongoing Canadian support for the Netherlands during the war, Seymour Cobley of the Royal Horticultural Society actually donated 83,000 tulips to Canada from 1941–1943, several years before the Royal Family followed suit.

While the Netherlands continues to send 20,000 bulbs to Canada each year (10,000 from the Royal Family and 10,000 from the Dutch Bulb Growers Association), by 1963 the festival featured more than 2 million, and today sees nearly 3 million tulips purchased from Dutch and Canadian distributors.

Photographer Malak Karsh became widely known for his photographs of the Tulip Festival.

Official Festival Site

Commissioner's Park - Dow's Lake 

Commissioner's Park, on the shores of Dow's Lake is a major centre of activity for the Tulip Festival. The largest concentration of tulips in the National Capital Region — some 300,000 — can be found planted along a 1.2 km section of the lakeshore.

See also

 Liberation Day (The Netherlands)
 Canada–Netherlands relations
 National Tulip Day in The Netherlands
National Canadian Liberation Monument, with its own "Man with Two Hats" sculpture

References

External links

"The Story of the Ottawa Tulip Festival"

Festivals in Ottawa
Gardening in Canada
1953 establishments in Ontario
Festivals established in 1953
Annual events in Canada
Flower festivals in Canada
Spring (season) events in Canada
Annual events in Ottawa